Lac d'Ourrec is a lake in Hautes-Pyrénées, France.

Lakes of Hautes-Pyrénées